King Henry of Cyprus may refer to:

Henry I of Cyprus (1218–1253), Henry le Gros
Henry II of Jerusalem (1285–1306, and 1310–1324), who was also Henry II of Cyprus